Oscar and the Wolf is the moniker for Belgian solo artist Max Colombie.

Life and career 

Oscar and the Wolf first gained international attention with the single "Orange Sky" in 2013, which got them support slots for the likes of Lou Reed, but gained critical acclaim and success with debut album Entity, released in April 2014. This album departed from the sound of Colombie's indie folk EPs and ventured into a new electronic sound. It was the first time Max Colombie took control, and the album was co-produced and mixed by Leo Abrahams.

'Entity' includes the tracks "Princes", "Undress" and "Strange Entity". It was received reviews in Belgium and abroad, including praise from Drowned in Sound and Les Inrocks, and went double platinum in Belgium.

'The Game', the first single off his second album, was released in July 2016. It peaked at n° 14 on the Hype Machine chart.

In 2015, after extensive touring across Europe, including a support tour for Roisin Murphy, Oscar and the Wolf sold out Sportpaleis (Antwerp, Belgium) and Heineken Music Hall (Amsterdam, Netherlands), with a total of 27000 tickets. In 2016, after headlining Pukkelpop festival, he sold out both Ancienne Belgique (Brussels, Belgium) and Paradiso (Amsterdam) in just 4 minutes. He announced new shows at Sportpaleis and Heineken Music Hall immediately after.

In an interview with Pi-Pôle, Max revealed the meaning behind his band's name: "Oscar is a name I really like – it's poetic and light. And wolf is the dark animal that comes out at night and howls to the full moon, and moon stands for solitude and coldness. It's bright and dark together, because that's how I see my music – as a balance between light and dark."

Discography

Studio albums

Extended plays

Singles

References

External links 

 

Belgian pop musicians
Synthpop groups
Musical groups established in 2010
2010 establishments in Belgium
Belgian LGBT musicians